Kahekordne mäng is a novel by Estonian author Karl Ristikivi. It was first published in 1972 in Lund, Sweden by Eesti Kirjanike Kooperatiiv (Estonian Writers' Cooperative). In Estonia it was published in 2003.

References 

1972 novels
Novels by Karl Ristikivi